The Hạnh Thục ca (幸蜀歌, 1885 in "Song of Voyage to Thục") is the best known work of Nguyễn Thị Bích, a Vietnamese court lady. The poem describes her experiences in the 1885 flight of Hàm Nghi. It is written in vernacular chữ Nôm using lục bát verse.

References

External links
 Wikisource
 Nguyễn Nhược Thị : Hạnh Thục ca online

Vietnamese poems